Jane Seitz (also known as Juliane Sperr; 17 August 1942 – 4 January 1988) was a German film editor. Seitz edited different films produced by Bernd Eichinger. She was his girlfriend for some time and committed suicide at the age of 45. Her last editorial credit was for the comedy film Felix, released in September 1988. Wolfgang Rihm orchestrated 1988/89 a text written by Seitz’ former partner Wolf Wondratschek Mein Tod. Requiem in memoriam Jane S. for soprano and orchestra.

Films (incomplete list) 

 1965: When the Grapevines Bloom on the Danube
 1966: Onkel Filser – Allerneueste Lausbubengeschichten
 1967: When Ludwig Goes on Manoeuvres 
 1968: Hunting Scenes from Bavaria
 1970: Deadlock
 1970: Student of the Bedroom
 1970: Die Feuerzangenbowle
 1971: Supergirl
 1974: Supermarket
 1975: Katie Tippel
 1976: Coup de Grâce
 1977: Soldier of Orange
 1977: The Conquest of the Citadel
 1978: Moritz, Dear Moritz
 1981: Christiane F. – We Children from Bahnhof Zoo
 1982: Comeback
 1984: The Neverending Story
 1985: The Assault of the Present on the Rest of Time
 1986: The Name of the Rose
 1986: Miscellaneous News
 1988:  (posthumous)

Literature 
 Katja Eichinger: BE, Hoffmann und Campe, Hamburg, 2012, 
 Julia Knight: Women and the New German Cinema (Questions for Feminism), 1992,

References

External links 
 
 

1942 births
1988 deaths
German film editors
Place of death missing
1988 suicides
Suicides in Germany
German women film editors